José Antonio Vélez Jiménez (born 16 September 1983), known as Ñoño, is a Spanish footballer who plays for FC Ascó. Mainly a left back, he can also operate as a left winger.

Club career
Born in Tarragona, Catalonia, Ñoño began his career with local Gimnàstic de Tarragona, and made his senior debut on 27 November 2004 by coming on as a second-half substitute in a 2–1 away win over Terrassa FC in the Segunda División. He finished the season on loan to CD Alcoyano of the Segunda División B.

Ñoño stayed in the third level for the 2005–06 campaign, appearing rarely for UE Sant Andreu and moving all the way down to the regional leagues with FC Andorra. In summer 2007 he returned to the third tier, signing for Marino de Luanco.

Subsequently, Ñoño spent four seasons with CF Pobla de Mafumet, Gimnàstic's farm team. On 10 July 2012 he was promoted to the main squad, making his official debut on 2 September against RCD Espanyol B and scoring his first goal with Nàstic late in the same month, against CE L'Hospitalet.

On 7 June 2013, Ñoño opted to not renew his contract with Gimnàstic, and was released. Late in the month, he signed with neighbouring CF Reus Deportiu also of division three.

Personal life
Ñoño's younger brother, Francisco, was also a footballer. Both played for Gimnàstic and Pobla.

References

External links

La Segunda B profile 

1983 births
Living people
Sportspeople from Tarragona
Spanish footballers
Footballers from Catalonia
Association football defenders
Association football wingers
Association football utility players
Segunda División players
Segunda División B players
Tercera División players
Divisiones Regionales de Fútbol players
Gimnàstic de Tarragona footballers
CD Alcoyano footballers
UE Sant Andreu footballers
FC Andorra players
Marino de Luanco footballers
CF Pobla de Mafumet footballers
CF Reus Deportiu players
UE Cornellà players
CE L'Hospitalet players
FC Ascó players